Mauro Montalbetti (born 11 October 1969 in Brescia, Italy) is an Italian composer.

Other Prizes 
 2005 Composition Prize city of Cesena, Italy: 1st prize
 2004 Scuola di Musica di Fiesele Opera Prize, Firenze, Italy: 1st prize
 2000 Britten on the Bay, New York: 3rd prize
 1999 Gaudeamus Prize, Amsterdam, the Netherlands: Finalist
 1990 Premio Evangelisti, Rome, Italy: Finalist
 1988 Premio Bucchi, Rome, Italy: Special Mention D juniores

References

Italian composers
Italian male composers
Living people
1967 births